The office of chief governor of Ireland existed under various names from the 12th-century Norman invasion to the creation of the Irish Free State on 6 December 1922. Common names were (Chief) justiciar (13th–14th centuries); (King's) lieutenant (14th–16th century); (Lord) Deputy (15th–17th centuries), and Lord Lieutenant (standard after 1690). The unofficial term Viceroy was also common.

Reasons for difficulty in stating terms of office include that many left the office empty for a period (sometimes to return to the Court of St. James's, sometimes to return to their British estates) before either being replaced or returning. There is difficulty in getting clear information before 1529; in the earlier years, there were frequent long vacancies, during which a Lord Deputy or Lord Justice would act as chief governor. The Irish Act of Union merged the Kingdom of Ireland with the Kingdom of Great Britain to form the United Kingdom of Great Britain and Ireland. The new United Kingdom came into being on 1 January 1801 resulting in the disappearance of the separate Irish Parliament: Though many expected the office of Lord Lieutenant to be abolished, it survived. Periodic debates throughout the nineteenth century erupt over whether it should be replaced by a 'Secretary of State for Ireland'. The office of Chief Secretary for Ireland (in effect number two in Irish government ranking) grows in importance, with the Lord Lieutenant gradually reduced to a largely though not completely ceremonial role.

The office was replaced by the Governor-General of the Irish Free State. In Northern Ireland the position was replaced by that of Governor of Northern Ireland.

Medieval
Source:
 Hugh de Lacy, Lord of Meath: 1172–73
 William FitzAldelm: 1173 
 Richard de Clare, 2nd Earl of Pembroke (Strongbow): 1173–1176 
 William FitzAldelm: 1176–1177 
 Hugh de Lacy, Lord of Meath: 1177–1181 
 John fitz Richard, Baron of Halton, Constable of Chester and Richard Peche, Bishop of Lichfield, jointly: 1181
 Hugh de Lacy, Lord of Meath and Hubert Walter, Bishop of Salisbury, jointly: (1181–1184)
 Philip de Worcester: 1184–1185 
 John de Courcy: 1185–1192 
 William le Petit & Walter de Lacy: 1192–1194 
 Walter de Lacy & John de Courcy: 1194–1195 
 Hamo de Valognes: 1195–1198 
 Meiler Fitzhenry: 1198–1208 
 John de Gray, Bishop of Norwich: 1208–1213
 William le Petit 1211: (during John's absence) 
 Henry de Loundres, Archbishop of Dublin: 1213–1215
 Geoffrey de Marisco: 1215–1221 
 Henry de Loundres, Archbishop of Dublin: 1221–1224
 William Marshal: 1224–1226
 Geoffrey de Marisco: 1226–1228
 Richard Mor de Burgh: 1228–1232
 Hubert de Burgh, 1st Earl of Kent 1232 (held the office formally, but never came to Ireland)
 Maurice FitzGerald, 2nd Lord of Offaly: 1232–1245
 Sir John Fitz Geoffrey: 1246–1256
 Richard de la Rochelle 1256
 Alan de la Zouche: 1256–1258
 Stephen Longespée: 1258–1260
 William Dean: 1260–1261
 Sir Richard de la Rochelle: 1261–1266
 David de Barry 1266–1268 
 Robert d'Ufford 1268–1270 
 James de Audley: 1270–1272
 Maurice Fitzmaurice Fitzgerald: 1272–1273
 Geoffrey de Geneville: 1273–1276
 Sir Robert D'Ufford: 1276–1281 
 Stephen de Fulbourn, Archbishop of Tuam: 1281–1288
 John de Sandford, Archbishop of Dublin: 1288–1290
 Sir Guillaume de Vesci: 1290–1294
 Sir Walter de la Haye: 1294
 William fitz Roger, prior of Kilmainham 1294
 Guillaume D'Ardingselles: 1294–1295
 Thomas Fitzmaurice Fitzgerald: 1295
 Sir John Wogan: 1295–1308
 Edmund Butler 1304–1305 (while Wogan was in Scotland) 
 Piers Gaveston: 1308–1309
 Sir John Wogan: 1309–1312
 Edmund Butler, Earl of Carrick: 1312–1314
 Theobald de Verdun, 2nd Baron Verdun: 1314–1315 
 Edmund Butler, Earl of Carrick: 1315–1318
 Roger Mortimer, 1st Earl of March: 1317–1318
 William FitzJohn, Archbishop of Cashel: 1318
 Alexander de Bicknor, Archbishop of Dublin: 1318–19 
 Roger Mortimer, 1st Earl of March 1319–1320 
 Thomas FitzGerald, 2nd Earl of Kildare: 1320–1321
 Sir Ralph de Gorges: 1321 (appointment ineffective)
 John de Bermingham, 1st Earl of Louth: 1321–1324
 John D'Arcy: 1324–1327
 Thomas FitzGerald, 2nd Earl of Kildare: 1327–1328
 Roger Utlagh: 1328–1329
 John D'Arcy: 1329–1331
 William Donn de Burgh, 3rd Earl of Ulster: 1331–1331
 Anthony de Lucy: 1331–1332 
 John D'Arcy: 1332–1338 (Lords Deputy: Sir Thomas de Burgh: 1333–1337 and Sir John Charlton: 1337–1338)
 Thomas Charleton, Bishop of Hereford: 1338–1340
 Roger Utlagh: 1340
 Sir John d'Arcy: 1340–1344 (Lord Deputy: Sir John Moriz (or Morris))
 Sir Raoul d'Ufford: 1344–1346 (died in office in April 1346)
 Roger Darcy 1346
 Sir John Moriz: 1346–1346
 Sir Walter de Bermingham: 1346–1347
 John L'Archers, Prior of Kilmainham: 1347–1348 
 Sir Walter de Bermingham: 1348–1349
 John, Lord Carew: 1349
 Sir Thomas de Rokeby: 1349–1355
 Maurice FitzGerald, 4th Earl of Kildare: 1355–1355
 Maurice FitzGerald, 1st Earl of Desmond: 1355–1356
 Maurice FitzGerald, 4th Earl of Kildare: 1356
 Sir Thomas de Rokeby: 1356–1357
 John de Boulton: 1357
 Maurice FitzGerald, 4th Earl of Kildare: 1357 
 Almaric de St. Amaud, Lord Gormanston: 1357–1359 
 James Butler, 2nd Earl of Ormond: 1359–1360
 Maurice FitzGerald, 4th Earl of Kildare: 1361 
 Lionel of Antwerp, 5th Earl of Ulster (later Duke of Clarence): 1361–1364 
 James Butler, 2nd Earl of Ormond: 1364–1365 
 Lionel of Antwerp, Duke of Clarence: 1365–1366 
 Thomas de la Dale: 1366–1367 
 Gerald FitzGerald, 3rd Earl of Desmond: 1367–1369, a.k.a. Gearóid Iarla
 Sir William de Windsor: 1369–1376
 James Butler, 2nd Earl of Ormond: 1376–1378
 Alexander de Balscot and John de Bromwich: 1378–1380
 Edmund Mortimer, 3rd Earl of March: 1380–1381
 Roger Mortimer, 4th Earl of March: 1382 (first term, aged 11, Lord Deputy: Sir Thomas Mortimer)
 Sir Philip Courtenay: 1385–1386
 Robert de Vere, Duke of Ireland: 1386
 Alexander de Balscot, Bishop of Meath: 1387–1389
 Sir John Stanley, K.G., King of Mann: 1389–1391 (first term)
 James Butler, 3rd Earl of Ormond: 1391
 Thomas of Woodstock, Duke of Gloucester: 1392–1395
 Roger Mortimer, 4th Earl of March: 1395–1398 (second term)
 Thomas Holland, Duke of Surrey: 1399
 Sir John Stanley: 1399–1402 (second term)
 Thomas of Lancaster, 1st Duke of Clarence: 1402–1405 (aged 13)
 James Butler, 3rd Earl of Ormond: 1405
 Gerald FitzGerald, 5th Earl of Kildare: 1405–1408
 Thomas of Lancaster, 1st Duke of Clarence: 1408–1413
 Sir John Stanley: 1413–1414 (third term)
 Thomas Cranley, Archbishop of Dublin: 1414
 John Talbot, 1st Earl of Shrewsbury: 1414–1421 (first term)
 James Butler, 4th Earl of Ormond: 1419–1421 (first term)
 Edmund Mortimer, 5th Earl of March: 1423–1425
 John Talbot, 1st Earl of Shrewsbury: 1425 (second term)
 James Butler, 4th Earl of Ormond: 1425–1427
 Sir John Grey: 1427–1428
 John Sutton, later 1st Lord Dudley: 1428–1429
 Sir Thomas le Strange: 1429–1431
 Thomas Stanley, 1st Baron Stanley: 1431–1436
 Lionel de Welles, 6th Baron Welles: 1438–1446
 John Talbot, 1st Earl of Shrewsbury: 1446 (third term)
 Richard of York, 3rd Duke of York: 1447–1460 (Lord Deputy: Thomas FitzGerald, 7th Earl of Kildare)
 George Plantagenet, Duke of Clarence: 1462–1478 (Lords Deputy: Thomas FitzGerald, 7th Earl of Desmond/Thomas FitzGerald, 7th Earl of Kildare)
 John de la Pole, 2nd Duke of Suffolk: 1478
 Richard of Shrewsbury, Duke of York: 1478–1483 (aged 5. Lord Deputy:Gerald FitzGerald, 8th Earl of Kildare)
 Edward of Middleham: 1483–1484 (aged 11. Lord Deputy:Gerald FitzGerald, 8th Earl of Kildare)
 John de la Pole, Earl of Lincoln: 1484–1485
 Jasper Tudor, 1st Duke of Bedford| 1485–1494 (Lord Deputy:Gerald FitzGerald, 8th Earl of Kildare)
 Henry, Duke of York: 1494–?1519 (Aged 4. Lords Deputy: Sir Edward Poynings/Gerald FitzGerald, 8th Earl of Kildare/Gerald FitzGerald, 9th Earl of Kildare)
 Thomas Howard, 2nd Duke of Norfolk: 1519–1523 (Lord Deputy:Thomas Howard, Earl of Surrey)

Lords Deputy
 The Earl of Ossory: 1523–1524
 Gerald FitzGerald, 9th Earl of Kildare: 1524–1529
 The Duke of Richmond and Somerset: 22 June 1529 (aged 10)
 Sir William Skeffington: 1529–1532
 Gerald FitzGerald, 9th Earl of Kildare: 1532–1534
 Sir William Skeffington: 30 July 1534
 Leonard Grey, 1st Viscount Grane: 23 February 1536 – 1540 (executed, 1540)
 Lords Justices: 1 April 1540
 Sir Anthony St Leger: 7 July 1540 (first term)
 Sir Edward Bellingham: 22 April 1548
 Lords Justices: 27 December 1549
 Sir Anthony St Leger: 4 August 1550 (second term)
 Sir James Croft: 29 April 1551
 Lords Justices: 6 December 1552
 Sir Anthony St Leger: 1 September 1553 – 1556 (third term)
 Viscount FitzWalter: 27 April 1556
 Lords Justices: 12 December 1558
 The Earl of Sussex (Lord Deputy): 3 July 1559
 The Earl of Sussex (Lord Lieutenant): 6 May 1560
 Sir Henry Sidney: 13 October 1565
 Lord Justice: 1 April 1571
 Sir William FitzWilliam: 11 December 1571
 Sir Henry Sidney: 5 August 1575
 Lord Justice: 27 April 1578
 The Lord Grey de Wilton: 15 July 1580
 Lords Justices: 14 July 1582
 Sir John Perrot: 7 January 1584
 Sir William FitzWilliam: 17 February 1588
 Sir William Russell: 16 May 1594
 The Lord Burgh: 5 March 1597
 Lords Justices: 29 October 1597
 The Earl of Essex 12 March 1599
 Lords Justices: 24 September 1599
 The Lord Mountjoy (Lord Deputy): 21 January 1600
 The Lord Mountjoy (Lord Lieutenant): 25 April 1603
 Sir Arthur Chichester: 15 October 1604
 Sir Oliver St John: 2 July 1616
 Henry Cary, 1st Viscount Falkland: 18 September 1622
 Lords Justices: 8 August 1629
 The Viscount Wentworth later The Earl of Strafford: 3 July 1633 (executed May 1641)
 The Earl of Leicester (Lord Lieutenant): 14 June 1641
 The Marquess of Ormonde: 13 November 1643 (appointed by the king)
 Viscount Lisle: 9 April 1646 (appointed by parliament, commission expired 15 April 1647)
 The Marquess of Ormonde: 30 September 1648 (appointed by the King)
 Oliver Cromwell (Lord Lieutenant): 22 June 1649
 Henry Ireton (Lord Deputy): 2 July 1650 (d. 20 November 1651)
 Charles Fleetwood (Lord Deputy): 9 July 1652
 Henry Cromwell (Lord Deputy): 17 November 1657
 Henry Cromwell (Lord Lieutenant): 6 October 1658, resigned 15 June 1659
 Edmund Ludlow (Commander-in-Chief): 4 July 1659
 The Duke of Albemarle: June 1660
 The Duke of Ormonde: 21 February 1662
 The Earl of Ossory (Lord Deputy): 7 February 1668
 The Lord Robartes: 3 May 1669
 The Lord Berkeley of Stratton: 4 February 1670
 The Earl of Essex: 21 May 1672
 The Duke of Ormonde: 24 May 1677
 The Earl of Arran: 13 April 1682
 The Duke of Ormonde: 19 August 1684
 Lords Justices: 24 February 1685
 The Earl of Clarendon: 1 October 1685
 The Earl of Tyrconnell (Lord Deputy): 8 January 1687
 King James II himself in Ireland: 12 March 1689 – 4 July 1690
 King William III himself in Ireland: 14 June 1690 
 Lords Justices: 5 September 1690
 The Viscount Sydney: 18 March 1692
 Lords Justices: 13 June 1693
 The Lord Capell (Lord Deputy): 9 May 1695
 Lords Justices: 16 May 1696
 The Earl of Rochester: 28 December 1700
 The Duke of Ormonde: 19 February 1703
 The Earl of Pembroke: 30 April 1707
 The Earl of Wharton: 4 December 1708
 The Duke of Ormonde: 26 October 1710
 The Duke of Shrewsbury: 22 September 1713
 The Earl of Sunderland: 21 September 1714
 Lords Justices: 6 September 1715
 The Viscount Townshend: 13 February 1717
 The Duke of Bolton: 27 April 1717
 The Duke of Grafton: 18 June 1720
 The Lord Carteret: 6 May 1724
 The Duke of Dorset: 23 June 1730
 The Duke of Devonshire: 9 April 1737
 The Earl of Chesterfield: 8 January 1745
 The Earl of Harrington: 15 November 1746
 The Duke of Dorset: 15 December 1750
 The Duke of Devonshire: 2 April 1755
 The Duke of Bedford: 3 January 1757
 The Earl of Halifax: 3 April 1761
 The Earl of Northumberland: 27 April 1763
 The Viscount Weymouth: 5 June 1765
 The Earl of Hertford: 7 August 1765
 The Earl of Bristol: 16 October 1766 (did not assume office)
 The Viscount Townshend: 19 August 1767
 The Earl Harcourt: 29 October 1772
 The Earl of Buckinghamshire: 7 December 1776
 The Earl of Carlisle: 29 November 1780
 The Duke of Portland: 8 April 1782
 The Earl Temple: 15 August 1782
 The Earl of Northington: 3 May 1783
 The Duke of Rutland: 12 February 1784
 The Marquess of Buckingham: 27 October 1787
 The Earl of Westmorland: 24 October 1789
 The Earl FitzWilliam: 13 December 1794
 The Earl Camden: 13 March 1795
 The Marquess Cornwallis: 14 June 1798

United Kingdom of Great Britain and Ireland
 The Earl of Hardwicke: 27 April 1801
 The Earl of Powis: 21 November 1805 (did not serve)
 The Duke of Bedford: 12 March 1806
 The Duke of Richmond: 11 April 1807
 The Viscount Whitworth: 23 June 1813
 The Earl Talbot: 3 October 1817
 The Marquess Wellesley: 8 December 1821
 The Marquess of Anglesey: 27 February 1828
 The Duke of Northumberland: 22 January 1829
 The Marquess of Anglesey: 4 December 1830
 The Marquess Wellesley: 12 September 1833
 The Earl of Haddington: 1 January 1835
 The Earl of Mulgrave: 29 April 1835
 Viscount Ebrington: 13 March 1839
 The Earl de Grey: 11 September 1841
 The Lord Heytesbury: 17 July 1844
 The Earl of Bessborough: 8 July 1846
 The Earl of Clarendon: 22 May 1847
 The Earl of Eglinton: 1 March 1852
 The Earl of St Germans: 5 January 1853
 The Earl of Carlisle: 7 March 1855
 The Earl of Eglinton: 8 March 1858
 The Earl of Carlisle: 24 June 1859
 The Lord Wodehouse: 1 November 1864
 The Marquess of Abercorn: 13 July 1866
 The Earl Spencer: 18 December 1868
 The Duke of Abercorn: 2 March 1874
 The Duke of Marlborough: 11 December 1876
 The Earl Cowper: 4 May 1880
 The Earl Spencer: 4 May 1882
 The Earl of Carnarvon: 27 June 1885
 The Earl of Aberdeen: 8 February 1886
 The Marquess of Londonderry: 3 August 1886
 The Earl of Zetland: 30 July 1889
 The Lord Houghton: 18 August 1892
 The Earl Cadogan: 29 June 1895
 The Earl of Dudley: 11 August 1902
 The Earl of Aberdeen: 11 December 1905
 The Lord Wimborne: 17 February 1915
 The Viscount French: 9 May 1918
 The Viscount FitzAlan of Derwent: 27 April 1921

See also
 Lord Deputy of Ireland
 Lord Justices (Ireland)

References

01
List of Lords Lieutenant
Lists of political office-holders in Ireland
Lists of political office-holders in the United Kingdom
List of Lords Lieutenant